The SGB Premiership Riders' Individual Championship is an annual motorcycle speedway contest between the top riders (or two riders) with the highest average points total from each club competing in the top tier league in the United Kingdom.

The same format of Championship applies for the tier two and tier three leagues, that of the SGB Championship Riders' Individual Championship (tier two) and National League Riders' Championship (tier three).

History
The competition replaced the Elite League Riders' Championship in 2017.

Winners

See also
List of United Kingdom Speedway League Riders' champions
 Speedway in the United Kingdom

References

Speedway competitions in the United Kingdom